Eugenia woodburyana (Woodbury's stopper) is a species of plant in the family Myrtaceae. It is endemic to Puerto Rico. It is a federally listed endangered species of the United States. It is threatened by habitat loss.

It has hairy oval leaves up to 2 centimeters long by 1.5 wide which are oppositely arranged. The inflorescence is a cluster of up to 5 white flowers borne in the leaf axils. The fruit is an eight-winged red berry up to 2 centimeters long.

The tree grows in the Sierra Bermeja and the Guánica State Forest of Puerto Rico, and there is reportedly one individual in the Cabo Rojo National Wildlife Refuge. In 1998 there were 45 trees of this species remaining.

It is named for the botanist  Roy Orlo Woodbury, an expert on Puerto Rican flora.

References

woodburyana
Endemic flora of Puerto Rico
Critically endangered plants
Plants described in 1980
Taxonomy articles created by Polbot